The Österman Brothers' Virago (Swedish: Bröderna Östermans huskors) is a 1925 Swedish silent comedy film directed by William Larsson and starring Frida Sporrong, Georg Blomstedt and Carl-Ivar Ytterman. It is one of several films based on the 1913 play of the same title by Oscar Wennersten.

Synopsis
The Österman brothers advertise for a maid to help with the housework on their farm. However when the attractive but domineering Anna arrives they come to regret this.

Cast
 Frida Sporrong as 	Anna Söderberg
 Georg Blomstedt as Lars Österman
 Carl-Ivar Ytterman as 	Karl Österman
 Nils Lundell as 	Nils Österman
 Jenny Tschernichin-Larsson as 	Helena Vestman
 Eric Engstam as 	Jan Vestman
 Edit Rolf as 	Ella Vestman
 Paul Seelig as 	Axel Ohlsson
 Valborg Hansson as 	Countess Lejonflyckt
 Georg af Klercker as Count Lejonflyckt

References

Bibliography
 Gustafsson, Tommy . Masculinity in the Golden Age of Swedish Cinema: A Cultural Analysis of 1920s Films. McFarland, 2014.
 Larsson, Mariah & Marklund, Anders (ed.). Swedish Film: An Introduction and Reader. Nordic Academic Press, 2010.

External links

1925 films
1925 comedy films
Swedish comedy films
Swedish silent feature films
Swedish black-and-white films
Swedish films based on plays
Silent comedy films
1920s Swedish films